Sacroiliitis is inflammation within the sacroiliac joint. It is a feature of spondyloarthropathies, such as axial spondyloarthritis (including ankylosing spondylitis), psoriatic arthritis, reactive arthritis or arthritis related to inflammatory bowel diseases, including ulcerative colitis or Crohn's disease. It is also the most common presentation of arthritis from brucellosis.

Symptoms and signs
People suffering from sacroiliitis can often experience symptoms in a number of different ways, however it is commonly related to the amount of pressure that is put onto the sacroiliac joint. Sacroiliitis pain is typically axial, meaning that the location of the condition is also where the pain is occurring. Symptoms commonly include prolonged, inflammatory pain in the lower back region, hips or buttocks.

However, in more severe cases, pain can become more radicular and manifest itself in seemingly unrelated areas of the body including the legs, groin and feet.

Symptoms are typically aggravated by:
 Transitioning from sitting to standing
 Walking or standing for extended periods of time
 Running
 Climbing stairs
 Taking long strides
 Rolling over in bed
 Bearing more weight on one leg

Cause 
Sacroiliitis is a condition caused by inflammation within the sacroiliac joint. This joint is located where the base of the spine, known as the sacrum, and the pelvis, known as the ilium, intersect. "Itis" is a Latin term denoting inflammation.

Since sacroiliitis can describe any type of inflammation found within the sacroiliac joint, there can be a number of issues that cause it. These include:
 Degenerative arthritis, or osteoarthritis of the spine, can cause degeneration within the sacroiliac joints and lead to inflammation and joint pain.
 Any form of spondyloarthropathies, which includes ankylosing spondylitis, psoriatic arthritis, reactive arthritis or arthritis related to inflammatory bowel diseases, including ulcerative colitis or Crohn's disease.
 Pregnancy can cause inflammation as a result of the widening and stretching of the sacroiliac joints to prepare for childbirth. Additionally, the added weight carried during childbearing can put an extra amount of stress on the SI joints, leading to abnormal wear.
 Traumatic injury such as a fall or car crash that affects the lower back, hips, buttocks or legs.

 Though rare, infection within the sacroiliac joints or another part of the body, such as a urinary tract infection, can cause inflammation.

Diagnosis 
Sacroiliitis can be somewhat difficult to diagnose because the symptoms it manifests can also be caused by other, more common, conditions. If a physician suspects sacroiliitis, they will typically begin their diagnosis by performing a physical exam. Since the condition is axial, they can often pinpoint the affected joint by putting pressure on different places within the legs, hips, spine and buttocks. They may also ask a patient to perform some stretches that will put gentle stress on the sacroiliac joints.  

X-rays, MRIs and other medical imaging tests can be used to show signs of inflammation and damage within the SI joints. Typically, a spine specialist will order a medical imaging test if they suspect ankylosing spondylitis or another form of arthritis to be the primary cause of inflammation and pain.

Treatment 
Treatment of sacroiliitis can vary depending on the severity of the condition and the amount of pain the patient is currently experiencing. However, it typically falls into one of two categories non-surgical and surgical:

Non-surgical 

In most cases sacroiliitis can be treated without surgery. Often patients will find relief through a combination of rest, heat / ice therapy, physical therapy and anti-inflammatory medication, like ibuprofen. Together these simple treatments help reduce inflammation in the affected SI joints.

For more severe forms of sacroiliitis, sacroiliac joint injections might be recommended to help combat symptoms. If chosen, a physician will inject a numbing agent, usually lidocaine, and a steroid containing powerful anti-inflammatory medication into the joint using fluoroscopic guidance. These steroid injections can be delivered up to three or four times a year and should be accompanied with physical therapy to help rehabilitate the affected joint.

Surgical 

Surgery is often the last resort when dealing with sacroiliitis and is rarely required. However, it may be a viable option for patients who are suffering from severe pain that is unresponsive to nonsurgical treatments and is significantly impacting their quality of life. In these cases, a minimally invasive procedure known as Sacroiliac Joint Fusion can effectively stabilize the joint and increase its load-bearing capacity by fusing it together.

See also
 Sacroiliac joint dysfunction
 Surgery for the dysfunctional sacroiliac joint

References

External links 

Vertebral column disorders